Imyan-Kuper (İmänküper) is a rural locality (a selo) in Chukadybashevsky Selsoviet, Tuymazinsky District, Bashkortostan, Russia. The population was 123 as of 2010. There are 4 streets.

Geography 
Imyan-Kuper is located 58 km southeast of Tuymazy (the district's administrative centre) by road. Alexeyevka is the nearest rural locality.

References 

Rural localities in Tuymazinsky District